The Open Collaboration Services (OCS) is an open and vendor-independent REST-based API for integration of web communities and web-based services into desktop and mobile applications. It allows the exchange of relevant data from a social network between the site and clients such as other websites and applications or widgets running locally on the user's machine or mobile device. 

The protocol is designed so that all applications can access multiple services providing OCS APIs.

The initial API design was done by openDesktop.org as part of the Social Desktop, especially as a cross-desktop backend provider. The API was standardised by freedesktop.org so that third-party providers are able to implement OCS API.

Non-KDE environments using the API in the past included the Maemo Downloads application store and Apps for MeeGo.

Modules

OCS consists of multiple modules, of which both servers and clients are free to choose which to implement. In the 1.6 version of the OCS specification the modules are:

 Person - user data
 Friend - social graph
 Message - in-site messaging between users
 Activity - activity streaming
 Content - downloadable content
 Fan - content favoriting
 Knowledgebase - access to FAQ items
 Event - calendaring
 Comments - content commenting
 Private data - private key-value store
 Forum - discussion topic structure
 Buildservice - application software building

References

External links
 Official Website
 Specification on freedesktop.org
 Open Collaboration Services tools and libraries

Social Desktop
KDE

Freedesktop.org